"El reloj" is a song of the bolero genre, with music and lyrics by Mexican composer and singer Roberto Cantoral, then a member of the Los Tres Caballeros trio.

History 
Cantoral composed the song in 1956, in Washington D.C., in front of the Potomac River, at the end of a Los Tres Caballeros tour of the United States. During the tour he had had an affair with one of the girls participating in the show, who was to return to New York the next morning. This love episode, and the presence of a lounge clock during their last meeting, were the events that inspired Cantoral, who would soon turn the relatively trivial episode into the story of a deep love.

Los Tres Caballeros premiered the song in 1957 and it was an immediate success. The following year it was recorded by trio Los Panchos in 1958. Since then, it has been interpreted by countless artists, in several languages. Lines from the song feature in a scene from the biographical film Selena in which Abraham Quintanilla teaches them to his daughter, Selena, by way of introducing her to the Mexican side of her Chicano heritage.

Interpreters of "El reloj" 
Spanish version
José José
Il Volo
Juan d'Arienzo
José Feliciano
Lucho Gatica (Latin Grammy Hall of Fame inductee)
Luis Miguel (#2 Hot Latin Tracks, #1 Latin Pop Airplay; recipient of the BMI Latin Award in 1999)
Los Panchos
Neil Sedaka
:es:Jorge Valdez
French Latino

Japanese version
Chiemi Eri
ja:Graciela Susana
ja:Teruhiko Aoi
ja:Jun Anna
ja:Yoichi Sugawara
ja:Hiroshi Mizuhara

See also

List of Billboard Latin Pop Airplay number ones of 1997

References

External links 
El reloj (Youtube: Original version of 1957 by Los Tres Caballeros)

1957 songs
1997 singles
Boleros
Mexican songs
Spanish-language songs
Latin Grammy Hall of Fame Award recipients
Luis Miguel songs
Song recordings produced by Luis Miguel
Warner Music Latina singles
Songs written by Roberto Cantoral